Alpera is a municipality in Albacete, Castile-La Mancha, Spain with a rich history of wine making. It has a population of 2,326 (2015).

References 

Municipalities of the Province of Albacete